This article shows the rosters of all participating teams at the women's basketball tournament at the 2019 Pan American Games in Lima.

Argentina
 

Source:

Brazil

Source:

Canada

Source:

Colombia

Source:

Paraguay

Source:

Puerto Rico

Source:

United States

Source:

Virgin Islands
 

Source:

References

Roster
Roster, Women
Basketball squads at the Pan American Games